Motrazepam (Ro06-9098) is a drug which is a benzodiazepine derivative.

See also
Benzodiazepine

References

Ethers
GABAA receptor positive allosteric modulators
Lactams
Nitrobenzodiazepines